The 1951 Giro di Lombardia, 45th edition of the race, was held in 1951.

General classification

Final general classification

References

1951
1951 in road cycling
1951 in Italian sport
1951 Challenge Desgrange-Colombo